Dale Foster (born 7 May 1958) is a former Australian rules footballer who played three games for Hawthorn in the Victorian Football League in 1980. He was recruited from Churchill, Victoria and played for Yallourn/Yallourn North in the Mid Gippsland Football League.

References

External links

1958 births
Australian rules footballers from Victoria (Australia)
Hawthorn Football Club players
Living people